The European Lutheran Conference (ELC) is an association of Confessional Lutheran churches in Europe. The full members of the conference are in altar and pulpit fellowship with one another. The members of the ELC are also members of the International Lutheran Council.

Member churches
The European Lutheran Conference includes the following Lutheran churches as full members:

 Evangelical Lutheran Church in Belgium (ELKB)
 Evangelical Lutheran Diocese in Norway (ELDiN)
 Evangelical Lutheran Free Church of Denmark (ELFKiDk)
 Evangelical Lutheran Church of England (ELCE)
 Evangelical Lutheran Church – Synod of France (EEL-SF)
 Independent Evangelical Lutheran Church (SELK) in Germany
 Portuguese Evangelical Lutheran Church (IELP)
 Spanish Evangelical Lutheran Church (IELE)

Organization

The current officers are Chairman Klaus Pahlen of the SELK; Vice-Chairman Leif Jensen of the ELFKiDk; and Secretary Claudio Flor of the ELCE. The 2018 Conference was in Hoddesdon, England.

See also
International Lutheran Council
List of Lutheran denominations

References 

International bodies of Lutheran denominations
International bodies of Lutheran denominations (currently existing)